The Carlos Palanca Memorial Awards for Literature winners for 2016. The awarding ceremonies were held on September 21, 2016, at the Peninsula Hotel Manila in Makati. Multi-awarded actor, director, and theater artist Antonio "Tony" Mabesa was conferred the Gawad Dangal ng Lahi for his career spanning 6 decades. He is a professor emeritus at the University of the Philippines Diliman and the founder of Dulaang UP.

English division 
Short story 
 First prize: "Zoetrope" by Richard C. Cornelio
 Second prize: "Sundays at the Cardozas’" by Larissa Mae R. Suarez
 Third prize: "Things That Matter" by Michelle Abigail Tiu Tan
Judges: 

Poetry
 First prize: "Hush Harbor" by Ana Maria K. Lacuesta
 Second prize: "Accidents of Composition" by Merlinda Bobis
 Third prize: "Homecoming Collection" by Angela Gabrielle Fabunan 
Judges: 

Essay
 First prize: "A View From Masada" by Joel Vega
 Second prize: "Circle" by Hammed Q. Bolotaolo
 Third prize: "Lip Reading" by Maria Roselle G. Umlas
Judges: 

Short story for children
 First prize: "No Winner" 
 Second prize: "No Winner"
 Third prize: "Saranggola" by Joemar L. Furigay
Judges: 

Poetry for children
 First prize: "No Winner"
 Second prize: "The Small Bright Things" by Jaime An Lim
 Third prize: "Miniature Masterpieces" by Patricia Celina A. Ngo
Judges: 

One-act play
 First prize: "Tic-Tac-Toe" by Peter Solis Nery
 Second prize: "1990" by Robert Arlo DeGuzman
 Third prize: "Gawani’s First Dance" by Patrick James Manongdo Valera
Judges: 

Full Length Play
 First prize: "The Floret Road" by Joachim Emilio B. Antonio
 Second prize: "No Winner"
 Third prize: "Tirador ng Tinago" by Michael Aaron C. Gomez
Judges:

Filipino division 
Maikling Kuwento (Short story)
 First prize: "Ang Daga" by Orlando A. Oliveros
 Second prize: "Bangkera" by Emmanuel T. Barrameda
 Third prize: "Cutter" by Paolo Miguel G. Tiausas
Judges: 

Maikling Kuwentong Pambata (Short story for children)
 First prize: "Ang Nakabibilib na si Lola Ising" by Annalyn Leyesa-Go
 Second prize: "May Pula" by Manuelita Contreras-Cabrera
 Third prize:  "Ambon ng Liwanag" by Eugene Y. Evasco
Judges: 

Sanaysay (Essay)
 First prize: "Pugon na De-Gulong" by Christopher S. Rosales
 Second prize: "Mga Pagsasanay sa Paggalugad ng Siyudad" by Eugene Y. Evasco
 Third prize: "#PaperDolls" by Segundo Matias Jr.
Judges: 

Tula (Poetry)
 First prize: "‘Di Lang Lalang" by Mark Anthony S. Angeles
 Second prize: "Tempus Per Annum at Iba pang Tula" by Louie Jon Agustin Sanchez
 Third prize: "#PagsisiyasatSaSugat " by Allan John Andres
Judges: 

Tulang Pambata (Poetry for children)
 First prize: "AngTotoo, Raya, Ang Buwan ay Itlog ng Butiki" by German Villanueva Gervacio
 Second prize: "Tiniklop-tiklop na Bugtong " by John Patrick F. Solano
 Third prize: " Awit ng Bakwit" by Vijae Orquia Alquisola
Judges: 

Dulang May Isang Yugto (One-act play)
 First prize: "Bait" by Guelan Varela-Luarca
 Second prize: "Billboard" by Mark Adrian Crisostomo Ho
 Third prize: "Ang Mga Bisita ni Jean" by Ma. Cecilia C. De La Rosa
Judges: 

Dulang May Ganap na Haba (Full-length play)
 First prize: No Winner
 Second prize: No Winner
 Third prize: "Chiaroscuro" by Lito Casaje
Judges: 

Dulang Pampelikula (Screenplay)
 First prize: "Kulay Lila ang Gabi na Binudburan pa ng mga Bituin" by Jimmy F. Flores
 Second prize: "Deadma Walking" by Eric Cabahug
 Third prize: "Alay ng Lupa sa Daing ng Dagat" by Ymmanwel Rico Provinio
Judges:

Regional languages division 
Short story - Cebuano
 First prize: "Tigpamaba sa Magay" by CD Borden
 Second prize: "Lumba" by Gumer M. Rafanan
 Third prize: "Estatwa" by Manuel M. Avenido, Jr
Judges: Richel G. Dorotan (Chairman), Manuel Faelnar, Hope Sabanpan-Yu

Short story - Hiligaynon
 First prize: " Ang Panaad " by Ritchie D. Pagunsan
 Second prize: " Nagakaangay nga Panapton " by Early Sol A. Gadong
 Third prize: " Bahal Nga Tuba " by Alain Russ G. Dimzon
Judges: Beulah P. Taguiwalo (Chairperson), Genevieve L. Asenjo, John E. Barrios

Short story - Ilokano
 First prize: No Winner
 Second prize: No Winner
 Third prize: "Pamulinawen" by Roy V. Aragon
Judges: Adelaida F. Lucero (Chairperson), Maria L.M. Frez-Felix, Arthur P. Urata Sr.

Kabataan division 
Filipino
 First prize: "Hulagway sa Rabaw ng Tubig" by Mikaela Lu Apollo
 Second prize: "Minsan Nag-Selfie ang Isang Propagandista" by Harvey D. Lor
 Third prize: "Ang Pinakamagandang Pamato sa Larong Piko" by Jason Renz D. Barrios

English
 First prize: "To Thine Own Self Be True" by Jill Esther V. Parreño
 Second prize: "Then The Abstract Was Misunderstood" by Dawn Gabriela Emmanuele G. Dela Rosa
 Third prize: "iThink, Therefore iAm" by Alpheus Matthew D. Llantero

Judges: Ligaya Tiamson Rubin (Chairperson), Maria Louella M. Tampinco-Lunas, Josefina A. Agravante

References 

66th Palanca Awards Winners

External links 
Carlos Palanca Memorial Awards for Literature

2016
Palanca